Ondu Motteya Kathe is a 2017 Kannada language romantic comedy film written and directed by debutant Raj B. Shetty who also appears in the lead role, along with Usha Bhandary, Shailashree, Prakash Tuminadu, Amrutha Naik, Shreya Anchan, Vj Vineeth, Rahul Amin, Deepak Rai Panaje and Ramdas playing supporting roles. The movie was released on 7 July 2017 to positive reviews. The Hindu called it the "Kannada film of the year". The film won the Filmfare Award for Best Film – Kannada. The budget of the film was estimated to be at 30 lakhs INR.

In 2019, the film was remade in Malayalam as Thamaasha and in Hindi as Ujda Chaman..

Plot
A bald Kannada teacher, Janardhana, finds his love blossoming with the stout Sarala whom he met through a flopped pre-arranged marriage function.

Cast
 Raj B. Shetty as Janardhana 
 Usha Bhandary as Janardhan's mother
 Shreya Anchan as Moha, marketing girl
 Shailashree as Sarala
 Amrutha Naik as E-Madam
 VJ Vineeth as Janardhana's Brother
 Mime Ramdas
 Deepak Rai Panaje as Guruji
 Prakash Thuminad as Srinivas
 Shine Shetty as English lecturer

Soundtrack

The soundtrack of the film was composed by Midhun Mukundan and lyrics by
Vishwajitj Rao, Raj B Shetty and Keerthan Bhandary.

Critical reception
The film received positive reviews from critics. Deccan Chronicle wrote "Do not miss to watch this tale of an egg. It makes you fall in love, laugh, cry and most of all, it makes you realise the most beautiful aspect of life." Shyam S Prasad of Bangalore Mirror wrote "Ondu Motteya Kathe does not follow in the footsteps of such earlier Kannada films though. There is freshness in the approach. From the dialogues to the performances, there is a touch of new thinking. Motte does fall into familiar approaches in the second half. The plot is wrapped in a predictable manner. But with everything handled subtly, it comes across as a pioneering effort." Rakesh Mehar of News Minute wrote "There’s little that goes wrong with Ondu Motteya Kathe. Light and frothy, but also warm and empathetic, this film is one comedy you surely should not miss." Baradwaj Rangan of Film Companion South wrote "But slowly, Ondu Motteya Kathe moves towards a genre that could be called an anti-rom-com: despite the finding-a-mate hilarity, there’s an undertow of genuine sadness"

The film is probably the best tribute to Rajkumar made on Kannada screen till date and the subtle references to the late matinee idol and his films are a delight to any film buff. This movie brings forth the legend of Annavaru'' in an inspiring role through portraits, movie posters, scenes and songs featuring him smack bang in the middle throughout this humorous yet sensible Kannada release. Apart from Dr Rajkumar’s inspiring presence, this ‘egg’ has apt and simple ingredients which makes for an impressive tale. Debutant Raj shetty plays a major role in this film, both as writer, director and lead actor in his bald avatar.

Movie was screened in Bangalore Bengali-Kannada Film Festival. It was one of the 4 films screened.

Awards

References

External links
 
 Official Website
 Ondu Motteya Kathe on Facebook

2010s Kannada-language films
2017 films
2017 romantic comedy films
Indian romantic comedy films
Kannada films remade in other languages
2017 directorial debut films